The Lagrange-class submarines were a class of foursubmarines built for the French Navy during World War I and the interwar period. Threeships of this type were built in the Arsenal de Toulon from 1913 to 1924, and onewas built at the Arsenal de Rochefort shipyard. Entering the French Marine Nationale from 1918 to 1924, the submarines served until the mid-1930s.

Design
The Lagrange-class submarines were constructed as part of the French fleet's expansion programmes from 1913 to 1914. During construction, though, the idea was abandoned and the ships were instead equipped with diesel engines.

Propulsion while surfaced was provided by two diesel motors built by Swiss manufacturer, Sulzer, and two electric motors.

The ships were equipped with eight torpedo tubes (fourin the bow; twostern and twoexternal), with a total of tentorpedoes and two guns. The crew of a ship comprised forty-sevenmen.

Ships 
Of the fourLagrange-class submarines, threewere built in the Arsenal de Toulon and one in the Arsenal de Rochefort. The ships were laid down between 1913 and 1914 and launched between 1917 and 1924. The ships were named after French scholars: Joseph-Louis Lagrange, Pierre-Simon Laplace, Henri Victor Regnault and the constructor of submarines Gaston Romazzotti.

Service
Of the foursubmarines, only twowere commissioned before the end of World War I: Lagrange and Romazzotti, which operated in the Mediterranean Sea.

From 1922 to 1923, the ships underwent a major refit in which they received new major conning towers, bridges and periscopes. All ships served in the Mediterranean Sea until 1935 for Lagrange and 1937 for the other threeships.

References

Citations 
 
 
 
 

World War I submarines of France
 
Submarine classes
Ship classes of the French Navy